Elachista caelebs is a moth in the family Elachistidae. It was described by Edward Meyrick in 1933. It is found in Kashmir.

References

Moths described in 1933
caelebs
Moths of Asia